Juan Méndez may refer to:

Juan Cortiñas Méndez (born 1925), Spanish footballer
Juan Carlos Méndez, one of the Chicago Boys
Juan E. Méndez (born 1944), Argentine human rights lawyer, United Nations Secretary-General's Special Adviser on the Prevention of Genocide
Juan N. Méndez (1820–1894), Mexican politician and general, interim President of the Republic in 1876-77
Juan Méndez de Salvatierra, Archbishop of the Roman Catholic Archdiocese of Granada, 1577–1588

Juan Mendez (basketball) (born 1981), Canadian basketball player
Juan Mendez (politician) (born 1985), member of the Arizona Senate
Juan Rafael Méndez (born 1985), Mexican football defender